The Committee for Investigation of National Aviation Accidents is the aircraft accident investigation agency of Poland regarding state and military aircraft. It is distinct from the State Commission on Aircraft Accidents Investigation, which investigates civil aviation accidents. , Minister of the Interior Jerzy Miller heads the agency.

The committee was established according to Paragraph 1, Article 140 of the Aviation Law of 3 July 2002, by virtue of the decision of the Minister of Defense.

The committee conducted the Polish investigation of the 2010 Polish Air Force Tu-154 crash.

See also

 State Commission on Maritime Accident Investigation

References

External links
 Committee for Investigation of National Aviation Accidents 
 Committee for Investigation of National Aviation Accidents 

Government agencies of Poland
Aviation organisations based in Poland
Poland